The Macchi M.15 was an Italian reconnaissance aircraft, bomber and trainer, designed by Alessandro Tonini and Piero Bergonzi and built by Macchi.

Design and development

The M.15, which first flew in 1922, was a two-seat biplane with wings of unequal span, its upper wing being of wider span than its lower wing. Its interplane struts were inclined in a "V" configuration. Its 238-kilowatt (320-horsepower) Fiat A.12 engine drove a two-bladed propeller in a tractor configuration and gave it a top speed of 185 kilometers per hour (115 miles per hour). It had fixed landing gear. The Macchi M.15bis was a three-seat passenger transport with similar attributes to the M.15.

Operators

Regia Aeronautica

Specifications (M.15)

See also

Notes

References

Aerei Italiani Macchi M.15

1920s Italian military reconnaissance aircraft
1920s Italian military trainer aircraft
M.15
Single-engined tractor aircraft
Aircraft first flown in 1922